Ghani Khan Choudhury Institute of Engineering & Technology is a central government funded engineering college, one of the 33 CFTI/GFTI under Ministry of the Education located in the Malda district of West Bengal, India.

History
The Institution was established in 2010, in the memory of A.B.A Ghani Khan Chowdhury,to provide a new horizon for education excellence and show new paths in the field of academics and engineering. Initially the institute was mentored by NIT Durgapur . The foundation was done by Smt Sonia Gandhi and former Prime Minister of India Dr.Manmohan Singh , the foundation stone of the permanent campus was laid by 
former President of India, Pranab Mukherjee.

Campus
The college has four academic buildings (Abdul Kalam, Visvesvaraya, Ramanujan and another unnamed), one administrative building (Chanakya), two hostels (Vivekananda and SC Bose), a library and computing centre building (Vidyasagar), a workshop building, staff quarters (Bhagirathi, Mahananda) and a canteen.  With , it has both football and cricket grounds. Construction of more structures is underway.

Academics

Academic programmes 
The institution offers four-year Bachelor of Technology program in electrical engineering, mechanical engineering and food technology, and three-year diplomas in civil, electrical, mechanical, computer science and food technology.

Admission
The admissions to Bachelor of Technology program which is affiliated to MAKAUT is done through WBJEE result and counseling as well as JOSAA counseling and JEE Mains result, while the diploma admission is done through the Institution's  entrance Examination.
50% seats are reserved for the students of West Bengal, 25% are reserved for North East India candidates and the remaining 25% for states other than West Bengal and North East States.

Achievements 
The college won Smart India Hackathon 2020 organized by MHRD in the Renewable Energy department.

The institute was listed in 2021 ATAL Ranking by MHRD under the most Promising Institute,(Institute of National Importance/CFTI) category.

See also
 GFTI
 Joint Seat Allocation Authority
 CFTI
 Government Funded Technical Institutes
 List of institutes funded by the government of India
 Universities and colleges of West Bengal
 List of institutions of higher education in West Bengal

References

External links

University Grants Commission
National Assessment and Accreditation Council

Engineering colleges in West Bengal
Universities and colleges in Malda district
Educational institutions established in 2010
2010 establishments in West Bengal